Carex kashmirensis is a tussock-forming species of perennial sedge in the family Cyperaceae. It is native to parts of central Asia.

See also
List of Carex species

References

kashmirensis
Plants described in 1894
Taxa named by Charles Baron Clarke
Flora of Pakistan
Flora of Tajikistan
Flora of Kyrgyzstan